SDC Verifier (Structural Design Codes Verifier) is a commercial finite element analysis post-processor software with a calculation core for checking structures according to different standards, either predefined or self programmed, and final report generation with all checks. The goal is to automate routine work and speed up a verification of the engineering projects. It works as an addon for popular FEA software Ansys, Femap and Simcenter 3D.

It is possible to apply complicated loads: buoyancy, tank ballast and wind. Automatic recognition of joints, welds and panels.

Implemented Standards
The rules for popular design standards are predefined in SDC Verifier. The open structure of the standard makes all checks customizable. The Custom standard can be saved and used for other models, password protected and added to the custom library. This standard can be shared between other users.

ABS 2004: Guide for buckling and ultimate strength assessment for offshore structures;
ABS 2014: Rules for building and classing (floating production installations);
AISC ASD 9th edition (July 1989);
AISC 360–10, 14th edition (2010);
API RP 2A LRFD, 1st edition (1993);
API RP 2A WSD 21st edition (2007);
DIN 15018 (1984);
DNV OS C101 LRFD (April 2011)
DNV OS C201 WSD (April 2011)
DNV Classification Notes NO. 30.1 (Buckling Strength Analysis, July 1995);
DNV RP C201: Buckling Strength of Plated Structures (Recommended Practice, October 2010);
FEM 1.001, 3rd edition (1998);
Eurocode 3, Part 1-9: Fatigue (2006);
Eurocode 3, Part 1-1: Member checks (2005);
Eurocode 3, Part 1-8: Weld Strength;
ISO 19902, 1st edition (2007);
Norsok N004, Rev. 3 (2013);

Alternative software
GENIE
Midas
nCode
SACS
SkyCiv

References

External links
Femap and SDC Verifier
Siemens and SDC Verifier
SDC Verifier Presentation
SDC Verifier new version

Computer-aided engineering software
Finite element software
Product lifecycle management
Siemens software products